Rubén Ignacio Martínez Núñez (born November 27, 1964 in Santiago, Chile), known as Rubén Martínez, is a former Chilean footballer who played in clubs of Chile and Mexico. He played as a forward.

Titles
  Cobresal 1987 (Copa Chile) and 1998 Primera B
  Colo Colo 1990 and 1991 (Primera División), 1991 (Copa Libertadores) and 1992 (Recopa Sudamericana & Copa Interamericana)
  Chile 1990 (Copa Expedito Teixeira)

Honours
  Cobresal 1989 (Top Scorer Chilean Primera División Championship)
  Colo Colo 1990 and 1991 (Top Scorer Chilean Primera División Championship)

References

External links
 

1964 births
Living people
Footballers from Santiago
Chilean footballers
Chilean expatriate footballers
Chile international footballers
Cobresal footballers
Colo-Colo footballers
Santos Laguna footballers
Tampico Madero F.C. footballers
Unión Española footballers
Provincial Osorno footballers
Deportes La Serena footballers
Tercera División de Chile players
Primera B de Chile players
Chilean Primera División players
Liga MX players
Expatriate footballers in Mexico
Chilean expatriate sportspeople in Mexico
Association football forwards
Sportspeople from Santiago
Chilean football managers
Segunda División Profesional de Chile managers